Maloarkhangelsk is a town and the administrative center of Maloarkhangelsky District in Oryol Oblast, Russia, located  south of Oryol, the administrative center of the oblast. Population:

History
The village of Arkhangelskoye, which was established in the 17th century, was granted town status in 1778 and renamed Maly Arkhangelsky. Later, the name transformed into "Maloarkhangelsk". During World War II, the town was under German occupation from 11 November 1941 until 23 February 1943.

Administrative and municipal status
Within the framework of administrative divisions, Maloarkhangelsk serves as the administrative center of Maloarkhangelsky District. As an administrative division, it is incorporated within Maloarkhangelsky District as the town of district significance of Maloarkhangelsk. As a municipal division, the town of district significance of Maloarkhangelsk is incorporated within Maloarkhangelsky Municipal District as Maloarkhangelsk Urban Settlement.

References

Notes

Sources

Cities and towns in Oryol Oblast
Maloarkhangelsky Uyezd